In Greek mythology, the name Eriopis (Ancient Greek: Ἐριῶπις) may refer to:

Eriopis, 'with the lovely hair', the daughter of Apollo and Arsinoe (herself daughter of Leucippus), thus possibly a sister of Asclepius.
Eriopis, the only daughter of the hero Jason and the Colchian sorceress Medea, the daughter of King Aeëtes. She was the sister of Medeus (also known as Polyxenus).
Eriopis, mother of Ajax the Lesser by Oileus. Scholia on the Iliad inform that she was a daughter of Pheres and Clymene, and was also known as Eriope or Alcimache. Otherwise, the latter was the daughter of Phylax.
Eriopis, consort of Anchises and mother by him of a daughter Hippodamia.

Notes

References 

 Hesiod, Catalogue of Women from Homeric Hymns, Epic Cycle, Homerica translated by Evelyn-White, H G. Loeb Classical Library Volume 57. London: William Heinemann, 1914. Online version at theio.com
 Homer, The Iliad with an English Translation by A.T. Murray, Ph.D. in two volumes. Cambridge, MA., Harvard University Press; London, William Heinemann, Ltd. 1924. . Online version at the Perseus Digital Library.
 Homer, Homeri Opera in five volumes. Oxford, Oxford University Press. 1920. . Greek text available at the Perseus Digital Library.
 Pausanias, Description of Greece with an English Translation by W.H.S. Jones, Litt.D., and H.A. Ormerod, M.A., in 4 Volumes. Cambridge, MA, Harvard University Press; London, William Heinemann Ltd. 1918. . Online version at the Perseus Digital Library
 Pausanias, Graeciae Descriptio. 3 vols. Leipzig, Teubner. 1903.  Greek text available at the Perseus Digital Library.
 Tzetzes, John, Allegories of the Iliad translated by Goldwyn, Adam J. and Kokkini, Dimitra. Dumbarton Oaks Medieval Library, Harvard University Press, 2015. 

Children of Apollo
Demigods in classical mythology
Women in Greek mythology
Corinthian characters in Greek mythology
Messenian characters in Greek mythology
Thessalian characters in Greek mythology
Locrian mythology
Children of Medea
Children of Jason